Neoclassical architecture is an architectural style produced by the Neoclassical movement that began in the mid-18th century in Italy and France. It became one of the most prominent architectural styles in the Western world. The prevailing styles of architecture in most of Europe for the previous two centuries, Renaissance architecture and Baroque architecture, already represented partial revivals of the Classical architecture of ancient Rome and ancient Greek architecture, but the Neoclassical movement aimed to strip away the excesses of Late Baroque and return to a purer and more authentic classical style, adapted to modern purposes. 

The development of archaeology and published accurate records of surviving classical buildings was crucial in the emergence of Neoclassical architecture. In many countries, there was an initial wave essentially drawing on Roman architecture, followed, from about the start of the 19th century, by a second wave of Greek Revival architecture. This followed increased understanding of Greek survivals. As the 19th century continued, the style tended to lose its original rather austere purity in variants like the French Empire style.  The term "neoclassical" is often used very loosely for any building using some of the classical architectural vocabulary.   

In form, Neoclassical architecture emphasizes the wall rather than chiaroscuro and maintains separate identities to each of its parts. The style is manifested both in its details as a reaction against the Rococo style of naturalistic ornament, and in its architectural formulae as an outgrowth of some classicizing features of the Late Baroque architectural tradition. Therefore, the style is defined by symmetry, simple geometry, and social demands instead of ornament. In the 21st century, a version of the style continues, sometimes called New Classical architecture or New Classicism.

History
Neoclassical architecture is a specific style and moment in the late 18th and early 19th centuries that was specifically associated with the Enlightenment, empiricism, and the study of sites by early archaeologists. Classical architecture after about 1840 must be classified as one of a series of "revival" styles, such as Greek, Renaissance, or Italianate. Various historians of the 19th century have made this clear since the 1970s. Classical architecture during the twentieth century is classified less as a revival, and more a return to a style was decelerated with the advent of Modernism. Yet still Neoclassical architecture is beginning to be practiced again in twenty-first  Century more in the form of New Classical Architecture and even in Gentrification and Historicism Architecture, the Neoclassical architecture or its important elements are still being used, even when the Postmodernist architecture is dominant throughout the world.

Palladianism

A return to more classical architectural forms as a reaction to the Rococo style can be detected in some European architecture of the earlier 18th century, most vividly represented in the Palladian architecture of Georgian Britain and Ireland. The name refers to the designs of the 16th-century Venetian architect Andrea Palladio.

The Baroque style had never truly been to the English taste. Four influential books were published in the first quarter of the 18th century which highlighted the simplicity and purity of classical architecture: Vitruvius Britannicus by Colen Campbell (1715), Palladio's I quattro libri dell'architettura (The Four Books of Architecture, 1715), De re aedificatoria by Leon Battista Alberti (first published in 1452) and The Designs of Inigo Jones... with Some Additional Designs (1727). The most popular was the four-volume Vitruvius Britannicus by Colen Campbell. The book contained architectural prints of famous British buildings that had been inspired by the great architects from Vitruvius to Palladio. At first the book mainly featured the work of Inigo Jones, but the later tomes contained drawings and plans by Campbell and other 18th-century architects. Palladian architecture became well established in 18th-century Britain.

At the forefront of the new school of design was the aristocratic "architect earl", Richard Boyle, 3rd Earl of Burlington; in 1729, he and William Kent designed Chiswick House. This house was a reinterpretation of Palladio's Villa Capra "La Rotonda", but purified of 16th-century elements and ornament. This severe lack of ornamentation was to be a feature of Palladianism. In 1734, William Kent and Lord Burlington designed one of England's finest examples of Palladian architecture, Holkham Hall in Norfolk. The main block of this house followed Palladio's dictates quite closely, but Palladio's low, often detached, wings of farm buildings were elevated in significance.

This classicizing vein was also detectable, to a lesser degree, in the Late Baroque architecture in Paris, such as in the Louvre Colonnade. This shift was even visible in Rome at the redesigned façade for Archbasilica of Saint John Lateran.

Neoclassicism

By the mid-18th century, the movement broadened to incorporate a greater range of classical influences, including those from Ancient Greece. An early centre of neoclassicism was Italy, especially Naples, where by the 1730s court architects such as Luigi Vanvitelli and Ferdinando Fuga were recovering classical, Palladian and Mannerist forms in their Baroque architecture. Following their lead, Giovanni Antonio Medrano began to build the first truly neoclassical structures in Italy in the 1730s. In the same period, Alessandro Pompei introduced neoclassicism to the Venetian Republic, building one of the first lapidariums in Europe in Verona, in the Doric style (1738). During the same period, neoclassical elements were introduced to Tuscany by architect Jean Nicolas Jadot de Ville-Issey, the court architect of Francis Stephen of Lorraine. On Jadot's lead, an original neoclassical style was developed by Gaspare Maria Paoletti, transforming Florence into the most important centre of neoclassicism in the peninsula. In the second half of the century, Neoclassicism flourished also in Turin, Milan (Giuseppe Piermarini) and Trieste (Matteo Pertsch). In the latter two cities, just as in Tuscany, the sober neoclassical style was linked to the reformism of the ruling Habsburg enlightened monarchs.

The shift to neoclassical architecture is conventionally dated to the 1750s. It first gained influence in England and France; in England, Sir William Hamilton's excavations at Pompeii and other sites, the influence of the Grand Tour, and the work of William Chambers and Robert Adam, were pivotal in this regard. In France, the movement was propelled by a generation of French art students trained in Rome, and was influenced by the writings of Johann Joachim Winckelmann. The style was also adopted by progressive circles in other countries such as Sweden and Russia.

International neoclassical architecture was exemplified in Karl Friedrich Schinkel's buildings, especially the Altes Museum in Berlin, Sir John Soane's Bank of England in London and the newly built White House and Capitol in Washington, D.C. of the nascent American Republic. The style was international. The Baltimore Basilica, which was designed by Benjamin Henry Latrobe in 1806, is considered one of the finest examples of neoclassical architecture in the world.

A second neoclassic wave, more severe, more studied and more consciously archaeological, is associated with the height of the First French Empire. In France, the first phase of neoclassicism was expressed in the Louis XVI style, and the second in the styles called Directoire and Empire. Its major proponents were Percier and Fontaine, court architects who specialized in interior decoration.

In the decorative arts, neoclassicism is exemplified in French furniture of the Empire style; the English furniture of Chippendale, George Hepplewhite and Robert Adam, Wedgwood's bas reliefs and "black basaltes" vases, and the Biedermeier furniture of Austria. The Scottish architect Charles Cameron created palatial Italianate interiors for the German-born Catherine II the Great in Saint Petersburg.

Interior design

Indoors, neoclassicism made a discovery of the genuine classic interior, inspired by the rediscoveries at Pompeii and Herculaneum. These had begun in the late 1740s, but only achieved a wide audience in the 1760s, with the first luxurious volumes of tightly controlled distribution of Le Antichità di Ercolano Esposte (The Antiquities of Herculaneum Exposed). The antiquities of Herculaneum showed that even the most classicizing interiors of the Baroque, or the most "Roman" rooms of William Kent were based on basilica and temple exterior architecture turned outside in, hence their often bombastic appearance to modern eyes: pedimented window frames turned into gilded mirrors, fireplaces topped with temple fronts.

The new interiors sought to recreate an authentically Roman and genuinely interior vocabulary. Techniques employed in the style included flatter, lighter motifs, sculpted in low frieze-like relief or painted in monotones en camaïeu ("like cameos"),  isolated medallions or vases or busts or bucrania or other motifs, suspended on swags of laurel or ribbon, with slender arabesques against backgrounds, perhaps, of "Pompeiian red" or pale tints, or stone colours. The style in France was initially a Parisian style, the goût grec ("Greek taste"), not a court style; when Louis XVI acceded to the throne in 1774, Marie Antoinette, his fashion-loving Queen, brought the Louis XVI style to court. However, there was no real attempt to employ the basic forms of Roman furniture until around the turn of the century, and furniture-makers were more likely to borrow from ancient architecture, just as silversmiths were more likely to take from ancient pottery and stone-carving than metalwork: "Designers and craftsmen [...] seem to have taken an almost perverse pleasure in transferring motifs from one medium to another".

A new phase in neoclassical design was inaugurated by Robert and James Adam, who travelled in Italy and Dalmatia in the 1750s, observing the ruins of the classical world. On their return to Britain, they published a book entitled The Works in Architecture in installments between 1773 and 1779. This book of engraved designs made the Adam style available throughout Europe. The Adam brothers aimed to simplify the Rococo and Baroque styles which had been fashionable in the preceding decades, to bring what they felt to be a lighter and more elegant feel to Georgian houses. The Works in Architecture illustrated the main buildings the Adam brothers had worked on and crucially documented the interiors, furniture and fittings, designed by the Adams.

Greek Revival

From about 1800 a fresh influx of Greek architectural examples, seen through the medium of etchings and engravings, gave a new impetus to neoclassicism, the Greek Revival. There was little direct knowledge of surviving Greek buildings before the middle of the 18th century in Western Europe, when an expedition funded by the Society of Dilettanti in 1751 and led by James Stuart and Nicholas Revett began serious archaeological enquiry. Stuart was commissioned after his return from Greece by George Lyttelton to produce the first Greek building in England, the garden temple at Hagley Hall (1758–59). A number of British architects in the second half of the century took up the expressive challenge of the Doric from their aristocratic patrons, including Joseph Bonomi and John Soane, but it was to remain the private enthusiasm of connoisseurs up to the first decade of the 19th century.

Seen in its wider social context, Greek Revival architecture sounded a new note of sobriety and restraint in public buildings in Britain around 1800 as an assertion of nationalism attendant on the Act of Union, the Napoleonic Wars, and the clamour for political reform. It was to be William Wilkins's winning design for the public competition for Downing College, Cambridge, that announced the Greek style was to be the dominant idiom in architecture. Wilkins and Robert Smirke went on to build some of the most important buildings of the era, including the Theatre Royal, Covent Garden (1808–1809), the General Post Office (1824–1829) and the British Museum (1823–1848), Wilkins University College London (1826–1830) and the National Gallery (1832–1838). In Scotland, Thomas Hamilton (1784–1858), in collaboration with the artists Andrew Wilson (1780–1848) and Hugh William Williams (1773–1829) created monuments and buildings of international significance; the Burns Monument at Alloway (1818) and the (Royal) High School in Edinburgh (1823–1829).

At the same time the Empire style in France was a more grandiose wave of neoclassicism in architecture and the decorative arts. Mainly based on Imperial Roman styles, it originated in, and took its name from, the rule of Napoleon I in the First French Empire, where it was intended to idealize Napoleon's leadership and the French state. The style corresponds to the more bourgeois Biedermeier style in the German-speaking lands, Federal style in the United States, the Regency style in Britain, and the Napoleonstil in Sweden. According to the art historian Hugh Honour "so far from being, as is sometimes supposed, the culmination of the Neo-classical movement, the Empire marks its rapid decline and transformation back once more into a mere antique revival, drained of all the high-minded ideas and force of conviction that had inspired its masterpieces".

Characteristics

High neoclassicism was an international movement. Architects reacted against the excesses and profuse ornament used in Late Baroque architecture. The new "classical" architecture emphasized planar qualities, rather than elaborate sculptural ornament in both the interior and the exterior. Projections and recessions and their effects of light and shade were more flat; sculptural bas-reliefs were flat and tended to be framed by friezes, tablets or panels. This was the first "stripped down" classical architecture, and appeared to be modern in the context of the Revolutionary period in Europe. At its most elemental, as in the work of Etienne-Louis Boullée, it was highly abstract and geometrically pure.

Neoclassicism also influenced city planning. The ancient Romans had used a consolidated scheme for city planning for both defence and civil convenience; however, the roots of this scheme go back to even older civilizations. At its most basic, the grid system of streets, a central forum with city services, two main slightly wider boulevards, and the occasional diagonal street were characteristic of the very logical and orderly Roman design. Ancient façades and building layouts were oriented to these city design patterns and they tended to work in proportion with the importance of public buildings.

Many of these urban planning patterns found their way into the first modern planned cities of the 18th century. Exceptional examples include Karlsruhe, Washington, D.C., Saint Petersburg, Buenos Aires, Havana, and Barcelona. Contrasting models may be found in Modernist designs exemplified by Brasília, the Garden city movement, and levittowns.

Regional trends

Great Britain and Ireland

From the middle of the 18th century, exploration and publication changed the course of British architecture towards a purer vision of the Ancient Greco-Roman ideal. James 'Athenian' Stuart's work The Antiquities of Athens and Other Monuments of Greece was very influential in this regard, as were Robert Wood's Palmyra and Baalbec. A combination of simple forms and high levels of enrichment was adopted by the majority of contemporary British architects and designers. The revolution begun by Stuart was soon to be eclipsed by the work of the Adam brothers, James Wyatt, Sir William Chambers, George Dance, James Gandon, and provincially based architects such as John Carr and Thomas Harrison of Chester.

In Scotland and the north of England, where the Gothic Revival was less strong, architects continued to develop the neoclassical style of William Henry Playfair. The works of Cuthbert Brodrick and Alexander Thomson show that by the end of the 19th century the results could be powerful and eccentric.

In Ireland, where Gothic Revival was also less popular, a refined, restrained form of the neoclassical developed, and can be seen in the works of James Gandon and other architects working at the time. It is particularly evident in Dublin, which is a largely neoclassical and Georgian city.

France

The first phase of neoclassicism in France is expressed in the Louis XV style of architect Ange-Jacques Gabriel (Petit Trianon, 1762–1768); the second phase, in the styles called Directoire and Empire, might be characterized by Jean Chalgrin's severe astylar Arc de Triomphe (designed in 1806). In England the two phases might be characterized first by the structures of Robert Adam, the second by those of Sir John Soane. The interior style in France was initially a Parisian style, the "Goût grec" ("Greek style") not a court style. Only when the young king acceded to the throne in 1774 did Marie Antoinette, his fashion-loving Queen, bring the Louis XVI style to court.

Many early 19th-century neoclassical architects were influenced by the drawings and projects of Étienne-Louis Boullée and Claude Nicolas Ledoux. The many graphite drawings of Boullée and his students depict spare geometrical architecture that emulates the eternality of the universe. There are links between Boullée's ideas and Edmund Burke's conception of the sublime. Ledoux addressed the concept of architectural character, maintaining that a building should immediately communicate its function to the viewer: taken literally, such ideas give rise to architecture parlante ("speaking architecture").

From about 1800 a fresh influx of Greek architectural examples, seen through the medium of etchings and engravings, gave a new impetus to neoclassicism that is called the Greek Revival. Although several European cities – notably Saint Petersburg, Athens, Berlin and Munich – were transformed into veritable museums of Greek revival architecture, the Greek Revival in France was never popular with either the state or the public.

Greece
After the establishment of the Kingdom of Greece in 1832, the architecture of Greece was mostly influenced by the Neoclassical architecture. For Athens, the first King of Greece, Otto I, commissioned the architects Stamatios Kleanthis and Eduard Schaubert to design a modern city plan. The Old Royal Palace was the first important public building to be built, between 1836 and 1843. Later, in the mid- and late 19th century, Theophil von Hansen and Ernst Ziller took part in the construction of many neoclassical buildings. Theophil von Hansen designed his first building, the National Observatory of Athens, and two of the three contiguous buildings forming the so-called "Athens Classical Trilogy", namely the Academy of Athens (1859) and the National Library of Greece (1888), the third building of the trilogy being the National and Capodistrian University of Athens (1843), which was designed by his brother Christian Hansen. Also he designed the Zappeion Hall (1888). Ernst Ziller also designed many private mansions in the centre of Athens which gradually became public, usually through donations, such the mansion of Heinrich Schliemann, Iliou Melathron (1880). The city of Nauplio is also an important example of Neoclassical architecture along with the island of Poros.

Hungary

The earliest examples of neoclassical architecture in Hungary may be found in Vác. In this town the triumphal arch and the neoclassical façade of the Baroque Cathedral were designed by the French architect Isidor Marcellus Amandus Ganneval (Isidore Canevale) in the 1760s. Also the work of a French architect, Charles Moreau, is the garden façade of the Esterházy Palace (1797–1805) in Kismarton (today Eisenstadt in Austria).

The two principal architects of Neoclassicism in Hungary were Mihály Pollack and József Hild. Pollack's major work is the Hungarian National Museum (1837–1844). Hild is famous for his designs for the Cathedral of Eger and Esztergom. The Reformed Great Church of Debrecen is an outstanding example of the many Protestant churches that were built in the first half of the 19th century. This was the time of the first iron structures in Hungarian architecture, the most important of which is the Chain Bridge (Budapest) by William Tierney Clark.

Malta

Neoclassical architecture was introduced in Malta in the late 18th century, during the final years of Hospitaller rule. Early examples include the Bibliotheca (1786), the De Rohan Arch (1798) and the Hompesch Gate (1801). However, neoclassical architecture only became popular in Malta following the establishment of British rule in the early 19th century. In 1814, a neoclassical portico decorated with the British coat of arms was added to the Main Guard building so as to serve as a symbol of British Malta. Other 19th-century neoclassical buildings include the Monument to Sir Alexander Ball (1810), RNH Bighi (1832), St Paul's Pro-Cathedral (1844), the Rotunda of Mosta (1860) and the now-destroyed Royal Opera House (1866).

Neoclassicism gave way to other architectural styles by the late 19th century. Few buildings were built in the neoclassical style during the 20th century, such as the Domvs Romana museum (1922), and the Courts of Justice building in Valletta (1965–1971).

Mexico

As part of the Spanish Enlightenment's cultural impact on the kingdom of New Spain (Mexico), the crown established the Academy of San Carlos in 1785 to train painters, sculptors, and architects in New Spain, under the direction of the peninsular Gerónimo Antonio Gil. The academy emphasized neoclassicism, which drew on the inspiration of the clean lines of Greek and Roman architecture, but also, for some monuments, from the Aztec and Mayan architectural traditions.

Neoclassicism in Mexican architecture was directly linked to crown policies that sought to rein in the exuberance of the Mexican Baroque, and to create public buildings of "good taste" funded by the crown, such as the Palacio de Minería in Mexico City, the Hospicio Cabañas in Guadalajara, and the Alhóndiga de Granaditas in Guanajuato, all built in the late colonial era.

Polish–Lithuanian Commonwealth

The centre of Polish Neoclassicism was Warsaw under the rule of the last Polish king, Stanislaus Augustus. The University of Vilnius was another important centre of the Neoclassical architecture in Europe, led by the notable professors of architecture Marcin Knackfus, Laurynas Gucevicius and Karol Podczaszyński. The style was expressed in the shape of main public buildings, such as the University's Observatory, Vilnius Cathedral and the town hall.  

The best-known architects and artists, who worked in Polish–Lithuanian Commonwealth were Dominik Merlini, Jan Chrystian Kamsetzer, Szymon Bogumił Zug, Jakub Kubicki, Antonio Corazzi, Efraim Szreger, Chrystian Piotr Aigner and Bertel Thorvaldsen.

Russia

In the Russian Empire at the end of the 19th century, neoclassical architecture was equal to Saint Petersburg architecture because this style was specific for a huge number of buildings in the city. Catherine the Great adopted the style during her reign by allowing the architect Jean-Baptiste Vallin de la Mothe to build the Old Hermitage and the Academy of Fine Arts in Saint Petersburg.

Spain

Spanish Neoclassicism was exemplified by the work of Juan de Villanueva, who adapted Burke's theories of beauty and the sublime to the requirements of Spanish climate and history. He built the Museo del Prado, which combined three functions: an academy, an auditorium, and a museum in one building with three separate entrances.

This was part of the ambitious program of Charles III, who intended to make Madrid the Capital of the Arts and Sciences. Very close to the museum, Villanueva built the Royal Observatory of Madrid. He also designed several summer houses for the kings in El Escorial and Aranjuez and reconstructed the Plaza Mayor, Madrid, among other important works. Villanueva's pupils expanded the Neoclassical style in Spain.

Germany 

Neoclassical architecture became a symbol of national pride during the 18th century in Germany, in what was then Prussia. Karl Friedrich Schinkel built many notable buildings in this style, including the Altes Museum in Berlin. While the city remained dominated by Baroque city planning, his architecture and functional style provided the city with a distinctly neoclassical center.

Schinkel's work is very comparable to Neoclassical architecture in Britain since he drew much of his inspiration from that country. He made trips to observe the buildings and develop his functional style.

United States
In the new republic, Robert Adam's neoclassical manner was adapted for the local late 18th- and early 19th-century style, called Federal architecture. One of the pioneers of this style was the English-born Benjamin Henry Latrobe, who is often noted as one of America's first formally trained professional architects and the father of American architecture. The Baltimore Basilica, the first Roman Catholic cathedral in the United States, is considered by many experts to be Latrobe's masterpiece.

Another notable American architect who identified with Federal architecture was Thomas Jefferson. He built many neoclassical buildings including his personal estate Monticello, the Virginia State Capitol, and the University of Virginia.

A second neoclassical manner found in the United States during the 19th century was called Greek Revival architecture. It differs from Federal architecture as it strictly follows the Greek idiom, however it was used to describe all buildings of the Neoclassicism period that display classical orders.

Rest of Latin America
The Neoclassical style arrived in the American empires of Spain and Portugal through projects designed in Europe or carried out locally by European or Criollo architects trained in the academies of the metropolis. There are also examples of the adaptation to the local architectural language, which during previous centuries had made a synthesis or syncretism of European and pre-Columbian elements in the so-called Colonial Baroque.

Two more Classical criteria belong, in Chile, the Palacio de La Moneda (1784–1805) and the Metropolitan Cathedral of Santiago (1748–1899), both works by the Italian architect Joaquín Toesca. In Ecuador, the Quito's Palacio de Carondelet (Ecuador's Government Palace) built between 1611–1801 by Antonio García. At the dawn of the independence of Hispanic America, constructive programs were developed in the new republics. Neoclassicism was introduced in New Granada by Marcelino Pérez de Arroyo. Later, in Colombia, the Capitolio Nacional was built in Bogotá between 1848–1926 by Thomas Reed, trained at the Berlin Bauakademie; the Primatial Cathedral of Bogotá (1807–1823), designed by Friar Domingo de Petrés; and in Peru the Basilica Cathedral of Arequipa built between 1540–1844 by Lucas Poblete.

Brazil, which became the seat of the court of the Portuguese monarchy, gaining independence from its metropolis as the Empire of Brazil, also used the resources of architecture for the glorification of political power, and it was decided to resort to architects trained in the Académie royale d'architecture. To this period belong the portal of the Imperial Academy of Fine Arts in Rio de Janeiro made in 1826 and the Imperial Palace of Petrópolis built between 1845–1862.

Argentina is another of the countries that seeks to shed its colonial past, but in the context of the reorganization of the country after independence in 1810, an aspect of power is sought that transmits the presence of the State, inspiring respect and devotion, including of course the architecture. However, an image of its own is not conceived, but the Classical canon is introduced, not in the form of a replica of buildings from Antiquity, but with a classical predominance and a lot of influence from French Classicism; which will last until the 20th century.

Spanish East Indies
Like most western tradition, it arrived in the Pacific Archipelagos via rule from New Spain (Mexico) during the period of governance by Mexico City as one of the best preferred architecture in the Spanish east indies, manifested in Churches, Civic buildings and one of the popular architectural ornament for newer styled Bahay na bato and Bahay kubo. When the power over the archipelago was transferred from Spain to the United States of America, the style became more popular and developed from slightly simple approach during the Spanish era, to a more ornamented style of the Beaux-Arts architecture sparked by the return of massive number of architectural students to the islands from the western schools. It also became a symbol of democracy and the approaching republic during the commonwealth.

See also

New classical architecture
Neoclassical architecture in Milan
Outline of classical architecture
Federal architecture
Nordic Classicism
John Carr (architect)
William Chambers (architect)
List of architectural styles

References

Further reading 
Détournelle, Athanase,  Recueil d'architecture nouvelle, A Paris : Chez l'auteur, 1805
Groth, Håkan, Neoclassicism in the North: Swedish Furniture and Interiors, 1770–1850
Honour, Hugh, Neoclassicism
Irwin, David, Neoclassicism (in series Art and Ideas) Phaidon, paperback, 1997
Lorentz, Stanislaw, Neoclassicism in Poland (Series History of art in Poland)
McCormick, Thomas, Charles-Louis Clérisseau and the Genesis of Neoclassicism Architectural History Foundation, 1991
Praz, Mario. On Neoclassicism

External links 

 Institute of Classical Architecture and Art
 Traditional Architecture Group
 OpenSource Classicism – project for free educational content about neoclassical architecture

 
A01
Revival architectural styles
Architectural styles
18th-century architectural styles
19th-century architecture
20th-century architecture